Pwalugu Hydroelectric Power Station is a  hydroelectric power station, under construction in Ghana. When completed, it is expected to connect to the planned  Kurugu Solar Power Station to form the  Pwalugu-Kurugu Hydro-Solar Hybrid Power Plant, the first of its type in the country.

Location

Overview
The Pwalugu Multipurpose Dam that supplies this power station has several purposes, including (a) creation of a reservoir lake that measures  (b) supply of water to the power station, whose energy output will vary between 16.5 megawatts and 60 megawatts, depending on the rate of water release from the reservoir and (c) supply of water to an irrigation scheme that measures , benefiting 15,000 people dependent on agriculture for a living.

Construction costs and funding
The infrastructure development project is budgeted at US$993 million. The Parliament of Ghana approved the budget item in March 2020. The procurement, engineering and construction contract was awarded to Power China International. However, other credible sources have reported the EPC contractor to be Sinohydro.

In June 2020, Power Construction Corporation of China (PowerChina), began site clearing and other pre-construction activities in Pwalugu. The budgeted cost includes the cost of erecting the 50 megawatts solar plant in East Mamprusi. Completion of construction and commercial commissioning are expected in 2024.

See also

List of power stations in Ghana

References

External links
 Ghana: 50 MW solar park combined with Pwalugu hydroelectric power plant As of 9 December 2019.

Power stations in Ghana
Upper East Region
Hydroelectric power stations in Ghana
Energy infrastructure in Ghana